Moulis is a commune in the Ariège department in southwestern France.

Geography
Moulis is situated on the D618 road, which follows the Lez river valley from Castillon-en-Couserans to Saint Girons. Either side of the Lez valley, the land surface of the commune rises steeply to forested mountains, giving a height difference of 1200 m between the lowest point of the commune and the highest.

Population
The inhabitants of Moulis are known as Moulisiens.

Much of the population is grouped in the villages of Moulis, Luzenac, Aubert and Pouech, all of which are in the Lez valley. The rest of the population is dispersed in small hamlets or isolated farms across the commune.

See also
Communes of the Ariège department

References

Communes of Ariège (department)
Ariège communes articles needing translation from French Wikipedia